Puss in Boots is a 1999 American animated adventure comedy film directed by Phil Nibbelink. It is based on the fairy tale of the same name.

The film features the voices of Judge Reinhold, Dan Haggerty, Michael York, and Vivian Schilling.

Plot

Puss in Boots serves as the narrator in the beginning of the film. He says that he used to belong to a poor miller and his three sons, the youngest being Gunther. Despite being the favorite, Gunther only inherits Puss after his father's passing while his older brothers, Zeek and Zak, inherit the mill and their father's donkey respectively. Zeek and Zak, jealous of Gunther, kick him and Puss out.

Puss and Gunther walk through town when a carriage carrying the princess speeds past them, followed by a shape-shifting ogre who wants to marry the princess. The princess' carriage breaks loose during the chase and falls down a cliff where Puss and Gunther take the princess and her cat to the mill, where they are able to temporarily defeat the ogre, with Gunther and the princess becoming attracted to each other. The princess returns to the castle to tell her father, the king, that the ogre will return. Smitten with the princess' cat, Puss decides to get into the castle to see her again. He has Gunther buy a pair of boots for him, along with a cape and hat. Puss then enters the castle to entertain the king and princess. The ogre returns and threatens to destroy the kingdom if the princess does not marry him by sundown, taking her beloved cat as leverage so she won't betray him. The princess decides to comply with the ogre's demands.

Puss devises a new plan. He has Gunther pose as the "Marquis of Carabas", a nobleman who can defeat the ogre. Puss directs the coachman to the Palace of Carabas, which is really the ogre's castle, and manages to arrive before them. He tricks the ogre into turning himself into a mouse and eats him. Then, as the carriage arrives, the ogre escapes Puss's mouth and exposes Gunther as a fraud. The ogre throws Puss and Gunther into the dungeon below the castle and takes the princess inside to marry her. In the dungeon, Puss and Gunther have a brief falling out before quickly reconciling and escape the dungeon with help from the princess' cat. Just before the ogre can marry the princess, Puss and Gunther break in and defeat him.

With the ogre gone, Gunther marries the princess while Puss marries her cat.

Cast
 Michael York – Puss in Boots
 Judge Reinhold – Gunther
 Dan Haggerty – The King
 Vivian Schilling – Princess (singing voice by Scottie Haskell)
 Kevin Dorsey – Ogre
 Patrick Pinney – Zeek, Coachman, Cobbler
 Charles von Bernuth – Zak
 Phil Nibbelink – Jester

Reception
The film was largely ignored when it was released and is mostly unknown today, but received mostly negative reviews for its sloppy and repetitive animation (though some were more lenient as Phil Nibbelink animated the entire film by himself), odd voice-acting, unfocused plot, weak humor and forgettable songs. Over the years, though, it has developed a cult following.

Trivia
Chip Albers, who was the sound designer for the film, later voiced Mercutio in Romeo & Juliet: Sealed with a Kiss, also directed by Nibbelink.

The Film was animated by Phil Nibbelink all by himself by using Macromedia Flash. 

It is one of the first animated feature films to be animated with Flash.

See also
List of animated feature-length films

References

External links
 
 
 

1999 direct-to-video films
1999 animated films
1999 films
American fantasy films
Direct-to-video animated films
Ogres in animated film
Films based on Puss in Boots
1990s American animated films
Animated films about cats
American independent films
1990s children's animated films
1990s English-language films